Helen Littleboy is a British film producer and director, specialising in documentary productions for British television.

In addition to her production roles, she is also a Senior Lecturer in Documentary Practice at Royal Holloway, University of London.

Filmography

 Does Your Mother Know (1994) - director
 White Tribe (Diverse Productions, 2000) - producer
 The Truth About Gay Animals (2002) - director
 Testosterone (Raw TV, 2003) - producer/director
 Michael Jackson and the Boy He Paid Off (2004) - director
 Michael Jackson's Boys (2005) - director
 The Battle for Brixton (Blast! Films, 2006) - producer/director
 The Real Vampire Chronicles (Blast! Films) - director
 Revenge of the Bin Men (Films of Record, 2009) - executive producer
 UR SO V41N (Films of Record, 2009) - executive producer
 My Boyfriend the MI5 Hoaxer (Ronachan Films, 2009) - executive producer

References

External links

British film directors
Living people
Year of birth missing (living people)